The Fort Lauderdale Symphony Orchestra was a Fort Lauderdale, Florida, United States, symphony orchestra founded in 1949 by high school orchestra director John Canfield.  The orchestra developed from an amateur group to a semi-professional orchestra with Emerson Buckley at the helm in 1963.  In 1985, the orchestra merged with the Boca Raton Symphony Orchestra to form the Philharmonic Orchestra of Florida, which would later be renamed the Florida Philharmonic, and would serve the South Florida metropolitan area until its financial collapse in 2003.

References

Disbanded American orchestras
Musical groups established in 1949
1949 establishments in Florida
1985 disestablishments in Florida
Musical groups disestablished in 1985